The Wiesen Viaduct (or Wiesener Viaduct) is a single-track railway viaduct, made from concrete blocks with dimension stone coverage. It spans the Landwasser southwest of the hamlet of Wiesen, in the canton of Grisons, Switzerland.

Designed by the then chief engineer of the Rhaetian Railway, Henning Friedrich, it was built between 1906 and 1909 by the contractor G. Marasi (Westermann & Cie, Zürich) under the supervision of P. Salaz and Hans Studer (RhB). The Rhaetian Railway still owns and uses it today for regular service.

Location
The Wiesen Viaduct forms part of the Davos–Filisur railway section between Wiesen and Filisur. At the western end of the viaduct is a non functioning Hippsche turning wheel.

History
The Wiesen Viaduct structure was designed by the then Chief Engineer of the Rhaetian Railway, Henning Friedrich. Construction began in October 1906, under the direction of another engineer, Hans Studer. With the launch of the Davos–Filisur railway in July 1909, the viaduct came into operation. It cost a total of 324,000 Swiss francs to build.

In 1926, the viaduct was the inspiration for Ernst Ludwig Kirchner's painting Brücke bei Wiesen.

Technical data

These technical characteristics combine to make the Wiesen Viaduct the Rhaetian Railway's largest stone and second largest bridge.

Gallery

See also

 Bernina Express
 Arch bridge

References

 See  the  references in Wiesener Viadukt (de Wikipedia)

External links

 
 

Viaducts in Switzerland
Rhaetian Railway bridges
Buildings and structures in Graubünden
Bridges completed in 1909
Stone arch bridges
Cultural property of regional significance in Graubünden
20th-century architecture in Switzerland